The Iowa River Railroad (IARR) operates freight service from Ackley, Iowa to end of track 1.4 miles south of U.S. Highway 20, north of Steamboat Rock, Iowa, for a distance of about 9 miles. With its office located in Steamboat Rock, Iowa, IARR carries corn byproducts and ethanol from Pine Lake Corn Processors to the interchange with the Canadian National Railroad in Ackley, Iowa.

History 

In June 2006, the IARR purchased from the UP and started operations of the Marshalltown Industrial Lead from Marshalltown, Iowa to Steamboat Rock, Iowa.  In June 2006, the IARR also purchased from North Central Railway Association a rail line running between Steamboat Rock and Ackley, Iowa, which needed rehabilitation prior to operating over.  Rehabilitation has been completed and that portion of the line is currently in use.

In 2012, the Iowa River Railroad filed to abandonment of line running from Steamboat Rock to Marshalltown with the Surface Transportation Board.

The same year, a request for imposition of a public use condition and issuance of an interim trail use for the line was filed on behalf of the conservation boards of both Marshall and Hardin Counties, as well as the cities of Marshalltown, Union, Steamboat Rock, Liscomb, Eldora and Albion and the Iowa Natural Heritage Foundation.  The action was approved by the Surface Transportation Board.

The abandoned line will be turned into the Iowa River Rail Trail.

Connection

The IARR connects with the Canadian National (formerly Illinois Central) at Ackley. Before abandonment the line also connected with the Union Pacific Railroad at Marshalltown.

Motive power

Current motive power had consisted of a single GP30, #3004, but has gained a recent addition GP38M, #3802.

External links
 UP Short Lines Directory

References

Iowa railroads
Switching and terminal railroads
Marshalltown, Iowa
Railway companies established in 2006